Idrettsklubben Start (or simply IK Start, translates to The sports club Start  ) is a Norwegian football club from the city of Kristiansand that currently plays in the 1. divisjon, the second tier of the Norwegian football league system. The club was founded on 19 September 1905. The club's current head coach is Sindre Tjelmeland. The team plays in yellow jerseys, black shorts and socks at home, and black jerseys, yellow shorts and socks away.

They play their home matches at Sør Arena, the club's own football stadium, opened in 2007. Before moving to Sør Arena, IK Start played their games at Kristiansand Stadion. The team's official supporter club was called "Tigerberget", until 2017, when the IK Start board decided to no longer have an official supporter club.

History
Start were Norwegian champions in 1978 and 1980. They participated in the European Cup in 1979 and 1981, as well as being qualified for the UEFA Champions League 2006–07. The years since 1995 have been turbulent, but recent investments have given greater expectations for the future. In 2004 they won the Norwegian 1. divisjon and were promoted to the top flight.

In 2005 they reached second place, following Vålerenga, after a strong comeback season in the Tippeligaen. For this, Start earned a place in the UEFA Cup 2006.

In 2006, after beating Skála of the Faroe Islands in the first qualifying round of the UEFA Cup, and Drogheda United of Ireland in the second qualifying round (after penalties), they reached the first round of the UEFA Cup, where they were knocked out by Ajax of the Netherlands.

2007 was a bad year for Start, with problems working as a team and management issues. It led to a disappointing 13th place, leading to Start's relegation to 1. divisjon. In 2008 the club got financial problems. The local government saved the club from bankruptcy. The financial difficulties has plagued Start for several seasons, due to the financial crisis and the Norwegian footballteams overspending, Start being no exception. The last couple of seasons, Start has downsized and saved money, for example by changing the turf on Sør Arena, the hopes being that the savings will keep the wheels turning in Start.

Ahead of the 2009 season, Knut Tørum was appointed head coach of Start. The next two seasons, Start was positioned at the lower half of Tippeligaen although achieving some strong results, like being the only team to beat Rosenborg in 2009, at Rosenborgs homeground Lerkendal, delaying their gold celebration. On 22 June 2011, Start had 13 points in 12 matches, and Tørum decided to resign hours before a cup-match against Strømsgodset, a match Start won without Tørum. Mons Ivar Mjelde replaced Tørum as head coach, but was not able to save Start from relegation. Start started the 2012 1. divisjon in strong fashion, leading the division and winning important matches and won promotion at the end of the season.

Start defeated Stabæk 4–1 on 4 July 2015. From 12 July 2015 to 18 September 2016, Start played 39 consecutive games without a win in Tippeligaen. This is the longest run without winning a single game across any top division in Europe.

Badge

Since the club was founded in 1905, the club badge had been a blue and white pennant. In November 2017, the badge was replaced with a more modernised version in all black. The new crest was in use for four years, before Start decided to return to the old one in March 2022.

Achievements 
 Eliteserien:
 Winners (2): 1978, 1980
 Runners-up (1): 2005
 Third place (7): 1973, 1975, 1979, 1983, 1984, 1991, 1992
 Norwegian Cup:
 Semi finalist (7): 1975, 1978, 1988, 2000, 2006, 2011, 2018
 1. divisjon:
 Winners (4): 1968, 1972, 2004, 2012
 Promotion: 1958–59, 1988, 1999, 2001, 2008, 2017

Recent history
{|class="wikitable"
|-bgcolor="#efefef"
! Season
!
! Pos.
! Pl.
! W
! D
! L
! GS
! GA
! P
!Cup
!Notes
|-
|2002
|Tippeligaen
|align=right bgcolor="#FFCCCC" | 14
|align=right|26||align=right|2||align=right|5||align=right|19
|align=right|21||align=right|72||align=right|11
|Fourth round
|Relegated to the 1. divisjon
|-
|2003
|1. divisjon
|align=right|9
|align=right|30||align=right|12||align=right|4||align=right|14
|align=right|53||align=right|50||align=right|40
|Third round
|
|-
|2004
|1. divisjon
|align=right bgcolor=#DDFFDD| 1
|align=right|30||align=right|24||align=right|2||align=right|4
|align=right|71||align=right|28||align=right|74
|Third round
|Promoted to the Tippeligaen
|-
|2005
|Tippeligaen
|align=right bgcolor=silver|2
|align=right|26||align=right|13||align=right|6||align=right|7
|align=right|47||align=right|35||align=right|45
|Fourth round
||
|-
|2006
|Tippeligaen
|align=right |6
|align=right|26||align=right|10||align=right|7||align=right|9
|align=right|29||align=right|32||align=right|37
|Semi-final
|
|-
|2007
|Tippeligaen
|align=right bgcolor="#FFCCCC"| 13
|align=right|26||align=right|6||align=right|8||align=right|12
|align=right|34||align=right|44||align=right|26
|Fourth round
|Relegated to the 1. divisjon
|-
|2008
|1. divisjon
|align=right bgcolor=#DDFFDD| 3
|align=right|30||align=right|17||align=right|8||align=right|5
|align=right|58||align=right|34||align=right|59
|Fourth round
|Promoted to the Tippeligaen
|-
|2009
|Tippeligaen
|align=right |9
|align=right|30||align=right|10||align=right|10||align=right|10
|align=right|46||align=right|52||align=right|40
|Third round
||
|-
|2010
|Tippeligaen
|align=right |8
|align=right|30||align=right|11||align=right|9||align=right|10
|align=right|57||align=right|60||align=right|42
|Quarter-final
|
|-
|2011
|Tippeligaen
|align=right bgcolor="#FFCCCC"| 15
|align=right|30||align=right|7||align=right|5||align=right|18
|align=right|39||align=right|61||align=right|26
|Semi-final
|Relegated to the 1. divisjon
|-
|2012
|1. divisjon
|align=right bgcolor=#DDFFDD| 1
|align=right|30||align=right|20||align=right|6||align=right|4
|align=right|71||align=right|35||align=right|66
|Fourth round
|Promoted to the Tippeligaen
|-
|2013
|Tippeligaen
|align=right |9
|align=right|30||align=right|10||align=right|8||align=right|12
|align=right|43||align=right|46||align=right|38
|Quarter-final
|
|-
|2014
|Tippeligaen
|align=right |12
|align=right|30||align=right|10||align=right|5||align=right|15
|align=right|47||align=right|60||align=right|35
|Fourth round
|
|-
|2015
|Tippeligaen
|align=right |14
|align=right|30||align=right|5||align=right|7||align=right|18
|align=right|35||align=right|64||align=right|22
|Second round
|
|-
|2016
|Tippeligaen
|align=right bgcolor="#FFCCCC"| 16
|align=right|30||align=right|2||align=right|10||align=right|18
|align=right|23||align=right|59||align=right|16
||Third round
||Relegated to the 1. divisjon
|-
|2017
|1. divisjon
|align=right bgcolor=#DDFFDD| 2
|align=right|30||align=right|16||align=right|7||align=right|7
|align=right|57||align=right|36||align=right|55
||Second round
||Promoted to the Eliteserien
|-
|2018
|Eliteserien
|align=right bgcolor="#FFCCCC"| 15
|align=right|30||align=right|8||align=right|5||align=right|17
|align=right|30||align=right|54||align=right|29
||Semi-final
||Relegated to the 1. divisjon
|-
|2019
|1. divisjon
|align=right bgcolor=#DDFFDD| 3
|align=right|30||align=right|19||align=right|5||align=right|6
|align=right|54||align=right|31||align=right|62
||First round
||Promoted to the Eliteserien
|-
|2020
|Eliteserien
|align=right bgcolor="#FFCCCC"| 15
|align=right|30||align=right|6||align=right|9||align=right|15
|align=right|33||align=right|56||align=right|27
||Cancelled
||Relegated to the 1. divisjon
|-
|2021
|1. divisjon
|align=right |9
|align=right|30||align=right|10||align=right|8||align=right|12
|align=right|59||align=right|59||align=right|38
||Fourth round
||
|-
|2022
|1. divisjon
|align=right |3
|align=right|30||align=right|16||align=right|6||align=right|8
|align=right|63||align=right|38||align=right|54
||
||
|}

Source:

Current squad

Coaching staff

Former head coaches

European record

References

External links

 
 Menigheden – official fan club

 
Football clubs in Norway
Start
Association football clubs established in 1905
1905 establishments in Norway
Sport in Kristiansand